Ninnindale is an 2014 Indian Kannada-language romantic comedy drama film directed by Jayanth C. Paranjee, a popular Telugu cinema film director making his debut in Kannada cinema. The film stars Puneeth Rajkumar and Erica Fernandes.

The film is produced by Vijay Kirgandur under the banner of Hombale Films. The soundtrack and original score is composed by Mani Sharma and the cinematography is by P.G.Vindha.  The film's title is inspired by the track called "Ninnindale" from Puneeth Rajkumar's earlier venture, Milana.

Plot
Vicky Venkatesh is from a rich Indian family based in New York. He is an adventurous person and is having fun with his friends like a perfect youth would do. Pramila is new to New York. She gets humiliated at an interview being an Indian. She gets cheered up by Vicky and his friends. She also becomes their squad member and each of them motivates the other.Pramila and Vicky goes trecking and sky diving together. When their adventure ended, Vicky embraced Pramila and the photos were published in local magazines. Pramila felt a strange bond towards Vicky.

One night when Vicky and Pramila were attacked by some goons, she confesses her love to Vicky. But Vicky refuses her proposal and promises to find her a suitable groom. There starts a roller coaster ride of meeting and refusing grooms. One of them embarrasses Pramila by their photograph on magazines. Pramila becomes sure that Vicky would eventually accept her. Akash, Pramila's collague arrives in NY where he starts to woo Pramila. It is revealed that Vicky had learnt about Akash and called him to NY to woo Pramila. Pramila learns about this, which breaks all her hope. She feels devastated and starts to ignore Vicky.

Vicky feels the void left by Pramila and feels lonely. His friend Nandu tells him that she understood the love of Pramila and wants him to accept her proposal. Vicky meets Pramila, but she gets hit by a car when she crossed the road. At the hospital, Vicky and Pramila confess their love. After their marriage Vicky comments that he would never kiss her again as his first kiss punished him with marriage. Vicky started to work in his family business now.

Cast

 Puneeth Rajkumar as Vicky Venkatesh
 Erica Fernandes as Pramila
 Sadhu Kokila as Lucky
 Avinash Sringeri
 Vinayak Joshi
 Sonia Deepti
 All Ok as Papu
 Shivarudra Naik – kanakapura
 Avinash
 Prathap
 Srinivas Prabhu
 Sihi Kahi Chandru
 Ullas
 Nirmal G Khona
 Thilak Shekar as Sachin from New York Police Department
 Bramhanandam as Sachin from New York Plumbing Department

Production
Telugu film director, Jayanth C. Paranjee who was brought up in Bangalore, Karnataka, expressed his intent in making a Kannada film with a script that he had for a long time and held very close to heart. The film script being a fun romantic story of new generation, is set for an extensive shooting at the USA thus making Puneeth's first long time schedule shot at a foreign locale. The launch of the film was held on 12 August 2013.

Initially actress Kriti Kharbanda was set to play the female lead, however it was later reported that the former Miss India finalist, Erica Fernandes was confirmed for the role. Television actress Nandini Vittal has given voice over for Erica Fernandes in this movie. Telugu actors Brahmanandam and Sonia Deepti played key roles. Thilak Shekar played a cop from the New York Police Department (NYPD).

Soundtrack 

Audio was launched on 31 December 2013 in presence of his brother Shivrajkumar. Initially it was learnt that Mahesh Babu is going to launching the audio of Ninnindale. Later he didn't attend the function due to unknown reasons. But Mahesh Babu wished the Ninnindale team and spoke about his relation with Rajkumar's family through. The film marks the debut of Telugu director Jayanth C. Paranjee into Kannada. Producer Vijay Kumar is happy with the first rush of the film and wants the audio release to make a grand statement.

The music is composed by Mani Sharma.

Reception

Critical response 

Shyam Prasad S of Bangalore Mirror scored the film at 2.5 out of 5 stars and says "The audience will also miss Harikrishna and Arjun Janya. Except for the lead actors, the rest of them are wasted. Sadhu Kokila does not evoke a single laughter while Brahmanandam’s debut in Kannada is forgettable. If it was not for the presence of Puneeth and his huge fan base, Ninnindale would’ve been a disaster." Shyam Prasad S of The Times of India scored the film at 3 out of 5 stars and says "Puneeth Rajkumar’s fans may not want to miss him in an adventurous avatar. Erica Fernandes is impressive as the girl next door. But PG Vinda’s outstanding cinematography is the high point of the film. Mani Sharma’s music will leave you humming."Sify wrote "Camera work by P.G.Vindha is brilliant and shows the beauty of New York in a very standard mode. Sky diving and breathtaking aerial stunts form the highlight of the movie. The expected movie has lived up to its expectations and has been welcomed grandly by the audience."

References

External links

2010s Kannada-language films
Films set in insular areas of the United States
2014 films
Films scored by Mani Sharma
Films shot in New York City
Films shot in New Jersey
2010s sports comedy-drama films
2010s masala films
2014 romantic comedy-drama films
Indian films set in New York City
Films shot in Bangkok
Indian sports comedy-drama films
Indian romantic comedy-drama films
Films directed by Jayanth C. Paranjee